The 413th Regiment is a regiment of the United States Army Reserve. Established 24 June 1921 as the 413th Infantry, part of the Organized Reserves, it was attached to the 104th Infantry Division. The regiment was originally headquartered in Salt Lake City, Utah. Ordered into active service on 15 September 1942, the regiment saw service during World War II with campaign participation credit in Northern France, Rhineland, and Central Europe.

Inactivated during post-World War II demobilization, the regiment was reactivated 25 March 1947 as part of the Organized Reserves and headquartered in Oakland, California. Since 1947, the regiment has undergone reorganization and its headquarters have moved, with the current headquarters being at Vancouver Barracks, Washington. The regiment is still part of the 104th Infantry Division, which is now a training division for the United States Army Reserve. Most recently, the regiment has served in support of the Global War on Terror.

Lineage 
Constituted 24 June 1921 in the Organized Reserves as the 413th Infantry and assigned to the 104th Division (later redesignated as the 104th Infantry Division)
Organized in January 1922 with headquarters at Salt Lake City, Utah
Ordered into active military service 15 September 1942 and reorganized at Camp Adair, Oregon
Trained at Camp Granite, California in 1943.
Inactivated 13 December 1945 at Camp San Luis Obispo, California
Activated 25 March 1947 in the Organized Reserves with headquarters at Oakland, California
Location of headquarters changed 22 January 1948 to Portland, Oregon
Organized Reserves redesignated 25 March 1948 as the Organized Reserve Corps; redesignated 9 July 1952 as the Army Reserve
Reorganized and redesignated 10 June 1959 as the 413th Regiment, an element of the 104th Division (Training), with headquarters at Portland, Oregon
Location of headquarters changed 1 November 1961 to Vancouver Barracks, Washington
Reorganized 10 January – 29 February 1968 to consist of the 1st and 3d Battalions, elements of the 104th Division (Training)
Reorganized 1 April 1971 to consist of the 1st, 2d, and 3d Battalions, elements of the 104th Division (Training)
Reorganized 16 April 1995 to consist of the 1st, 2d, and 3d Battalions, elements of the 104th Division (Institutional Training)
Elements ordered into active military service in support of the War on Terrorism
1st and 2d Battalions released 1 October 2007 from assignment to the 104th Division (Institutional Training)
Reorganized 16 October 2007 to consist of the 1st, 2d, and 4th Battalions, and the 3d Battalion, an element of the 104th Division (Institutional Training)
Reorganized 15 April 2009 to consist of the 1st, 2d, and 4th Battalions
1st Battalion inactivated on 9 December 2016 in a ceremony held in Vancouver, WA.

Campaign streamers

Decorations
 Presidential Unit Citation, 2nd Battalion, streamer embroidered DUREN
 Army Superior Unit Award, 1st and 2nd Battalion, streamer embroidered 2005–2006

Notable members
Cecil H. Bolton, First Lieutenant, awarded the Medal of Honor
Willy F. James, Jr., Private First Class, posthumously awarded the Medal of Honor

References

413
Military units and formations established in 1921